Border Romance is a 1929 American pre-Code Western romance film directed by Richard Thorpe. An early sound film, it stars Armida, Don Terry, Marjorie Kane, and Victor Potel.

A copy is preserved at the Library of Congress, Packard.

Cast

 Armida as Conchita Cortez
 Don Terry as Bob Hamlin
 Marjorie Kane as Nina 
 Victor Potel as Slim
 Wesley Barry as Victor Hamlin
 J. Frank Glendon as Buck 
 Harry von Meter as Captain of Rurales
 Willy Castello as Lieutenant of Rurales (credited as William Costello)
 Fred Burns as Rustler (uncredited)
 Jim Mason as Rustler (uncredited)

References

External links

 
 

1929 films
1929 Western (genre) films
American Western (genre) films
American black-and-white films
Films directed by Richard Thorpe
Tiffany Pictures films
Transitional sound Western (genre) films
1920s American films